Mitriostigma barteri is a species of plant in the family Rubiaceae. It is found in Cameroon and Equatorial Guinea. Its natural habitat is subtropical or tropical moist lowland forests. It is threatened by habitat loss.

Sources

Mitriostigma
Endangered plants
Taxonomy articles created by Polbot
Taxobox binomials not recognized by IUCN